Stephen Longespée ( 1216 – 1260) was an English knight who served as Seneschal of Gascony and as Justiciar of Ireland.

Life
Longespée was a son of William Longespée, 3rd Earl of Salisbury and Ela of Salisbury. He was a cousin of the King Henry III of England. His wife Emmeline was an heiress of her grandfather Walter de Riddlesford, and brought possessions in Connacht and Leinster in Ireland. In 1255, Longespée was appointed the Seneschal of Gascony, where his administration was hampered with disputes with Lord Edward. After Lord Edward returned to England in 1255, Longespée remained until 1257 as Seneschal, before returning to England. When Lord Edward reluctantly recognised the Provisions of Oxford in 1258, Longespée was one of the four counsellors given to accept the reform program. In 1259, Longespée was appointed Justiciar of Ireland. He died in 1260.

Marriage and issue
Stephen married a distant cousin, Emmeline de Riddlesford, who was the widow of Hugh de Lacy, 1st Earl of Ulster, and the daughter of Walter de Riddlesford (son of another Walter de Riddlesford, and Amabilis Fitzhenry) and Annora Vitré. They had the following known issue:
Emeline Longespée (died 1291), married Maurice FitzGerald, had issue
Ela Longespée (died 1276), married Roger la Zouche, had issue.

Citations

References

Year of birth unknown
1260 deaths
13th-century English people
Medieval English knights
Seneschals of Gascony
Younger sons of earls